Paul James Grayson,  (born 30 May 1971 in Chorley, Lancashire) is the former assistant head coach of 
Northampton Saints rugby union club. He formerly played at fly-half for Northampton, for whom he was the all-time leading points scorer, and England.  He is known as "Larry" or "Grase".

Prior to Northampton, he played for Preston Grasshoppers and Waterloo.  Paul also had a spell at Accrington Stanley as a youth team player. Whilst at Northampton he started in the victorious 2000 Heineken Cup Final, kicking all 9 of Northampton's points as they defeated Munster.

Grayson made his international debut against Western Samoa in December 1995. He was part of the 2003 Rugby World Cup winning England squad.

Northampton announced on 20 November 2012 that Grayson would be leaving the club by mutual consent.

Grayson has three sons, one of whom, James, is an established professional rugby player who plays for Northampton Saints. His other two sons, Joel and Ethan are in the Northampton Saints EPDG youth setup.

See also
 List of top English points scorers and try scorers

References

External links 
 Saints Profile
 Sporting heroes 1 2
 Profile at scrum.com
 Northampton Saints news item

1971 births
Living people
British & Irish Lions rugby union players from England
England international rugby union players
English rugby union players
Lancashire County RFU players
Members of the Order of the British Empire
Northampton Saints players
Rugby union fly-halves
Rugby union players from Chorley
Waterloo R.F.C. players